Auw may refer to the following places:

Auw an der Kyll, in Speicher, Bitburg-Prüm, Rhineland-Palatinate, Germany
Auw bei Prüm, in Prüm, Bitburg-Prüm, Rhineland-Palatinate, Germany
Auw, Switzerland, in the canton of Aargau, Switzerland

AUW, or auw, may be an abbreviation or acronym for:
Aircraft gross weight or All-Up Weight 
Allumwandlung, a chess move
Aloha United Way, an affiliate of United Way of America
Asian University for Women, Chittagong, Bangladesh
Ahfad University for Women, Omdurman, Sudan
AUW, the IATA code for Wausau Downtown Airport, Wisconsin, USA
auw, the ISO 639-3 code for the Awyi language spoken in the province of Papua, Indonesia
AUW, the National Rail code for Ascott-under-Wychwood railway station, Oxfordshire, England

See also